Großschönau, Groß Schönau or Velký Šenov may refer to:

 Großschönau, Saxony (Grußschiene), a village in Germany
 Großschönau, Waldviertel, a village in Austria
 Velký Šenov, a town in the Czech Republic